Kimberly Lynne Rhodenbaugh (born March 26, 1966), later known by her married name Kimberly Lewallen, is an American former competition swimmer who represented the United States at the 1984 Summer Olympics in Los Angeles.  She competed in the women's 200-meter breaststroke, and finished eighth in the event final with a time of 2:35.51.

Rhodenbaugh attended the University of Texas at Austin, where she swam for coach Richard Quick's Texas Longhorns swimming and diving team in National Collegiate Athletic Association (NCAA) competition.  She won NCAA national championships in the women's 200-yard breaststroke (2:14.92) and 200-yard individual medley (2:01.93) in 1985.

Life after competition swimming 

Rhodenbaugh continued to stay active in swimming for nearly 30 years as a coach and an instructor.  She is a motivational speaker, author of Master of the Mask, and founder of the non-profit organization Freedom Now, focusing on bringing hope and encouragement to sexual assault victims.  Rhodenbaugh married Nolan Lewallen in 2016 and together they have 7 children and 4 grandchildren.

See also
 List of University of Texas at Austin alumni
 List of World Aquatics Championships medalists in swimming (women)

References

1966 births
Living people
American female breaststroke swimmers
Olympic swimmers of the United States
Swimmers from Cincinnati
Swimmers at the 1983 Pan American Games
Swimmers at the 1984 Summer Olympics
Texas Longhorns women's swimmers
World Aquatics Championships medalists in swimming
Pan American Games gold medalists for the United States
Pan American Games bronze medalists for the United States
Pan American Games medalists in swimming
Universiade medalists in swimming
Universiade gold medalists for the United States
Medalists at the 1987 Summer Universiade
Medalists at the 1983 Pan American Games